Luis de los Cobos Almaraz (Valladolid, 20 April 1927 – Geneva, 16 November 2012) was a Spanish composer. In 1944 he was briefly jailed for taking part in protests against the Francoist government, and after he finished his studies in 1949 he couldn't find a job since he lacked the certificate of adherence to the Spanish State, so he went to exile, settling in Geneva after studying orchestral conducting under Bernardo Molinari in Rome and Eugène Bigot in Paris. Like Xavier Montsalvatge and Manuel Castillo he has been defined as a missing link in the postwar Spanish music, as he was influenced by Shostakovichian modernism while the Spanish scene evolved from nationalism to the Darmstadt avantgarde through his contemporaries of the 1951 Generation. He composed four operas, two symphonies, four concertos and six string quartets.

Compositions

Opera
 La gloria de Don Ramiro (1975)
 Mariana Pineda (1982)
 La Pasión de Gregorio (1983)
 The Incarnation of Desire (1994)

Ballet
 Winnie the Pooh (1992)

Orchestral

Symphony orchestra

 Symphony No. 1 ″Cursus Vitae″ (1956)
 Agonía recurrente (1966)
 Symphony No. 2 ″El pinar perdido″ (2012)

String orchestra

 Jungla 1967 (1967)

Chamber orchestra

 SoJin Suite (música para un nacimiento y un bautizo) (1991)
 Cuentos de la princesita (2002)

Concertante

Cello

 Cello Concerto No. 1 (1958)
 Cello Concerto No. 2 ″De la resurrección″ (1981)

Piano

 Album del olvido (1982), for two pianos and orchestra

Guitar

 Concierto de Nerja (1991)

Violin

 Concierto de los cercos (1995)
 Rapsodia de la espera (2004)

Chamber music

Duos

 Nana de la madre pobre (1952), for cello and piano
 Elegía a las manos de una muchacha (1952), for cello and piano
 Retrato del olvido y ojos de pájaro herido (1983), for cello and piano
 Duo para violín y viola (1985)
 Sonata del cisne (2003), for violin and piano
 Nana del Campogrande (2006), for violin and piano

Trios

 Blue Talks (1987), for two pianos and percussion

Quartets

 String Quartet No. 1 ″De la pequeña muerte″ (1978)
 String Quartet No. 2 ″Una princesa de Kranach en el tren″ (1983)
 Serenata caprichosa (1987), for flute, bassoon, harp and guitar
 String Quartet No. 3 ″La nada y el mar″ (1988)
 String Quartet No. 4 ″De la ausencia″ (1993)
 String Quartet No. 5 ″Del ensueño″ (1999)
 String Quartet No. 6 ″Juego de la vida y de la muerte″ (2000)

Solo

Guitar

 Añejo mosaico (1952)

Violin

 Caprichos (1987)

Cello

 Ariana Suite (1996)

Choral

With orchestra

 Oración paralela (Requiem) (1977)
 Misa de Requiem (1996)

A cappella

 Miserere (1950)

Vocal

with orchestra

 La tierra de Alvargonzález (1951)
 Hijo del sol y de la sombra (1956)

with chamber ensemble

 Nocturno (1952)
 Hacia el Sur se fue el domingo (1966)
 Tres cuentos populares (1978)
 Cinco cantos (1981)
 Cuatro lieder para cantaor flamenco (1981)
 La destrucción o el amor (1981)
 Weinheber Lieder (1996)
 Suite Ferrández (1997)

with piano

 Canciones en el estilo popular (1950)
 Homenaje a Miguel Hernández (1952)
 La voz a tí debida (1985)

with other solo instrument

 Canciones para mezzo y guitarra (1985)
 Cuatro piezas blancas (1986), for soprano and two clarinets

Electronic music
 Suite infantil (1986)

References

1927 births
2012 deaths
Spanish composers
Spanish male composers
20th-century classical music
20th-century Spanish musicians
20th-century Spanish male musicians